The men's modern pentathlon at the 2016 Summer Olympics in Rio de Janeiro was held on 19 August. Three venues were used: Deodoro Aquatics Centre (swimming), Deodoro Stadium (horse-riding and combined running and shooting) and Youth Arena (fencing).

The medals were presented by Timothy Fok, IOC member, Hong Kong and Klaus Schormann, President of the UIPM.

Competition format 
The modern pentathlon consisted of five events, all held on the same day. The format was slightly different from the typical modern pentathlon, with two events combined at the end.
 Fencing: A round-robin, one-touch épée competition. Score was based on winning percentage.
 Swimming: A 200 m freestyle race. Score was based on time.
 Riding: A show jumping competition. Score based on penalties for fallen bars, refusals, falls, and being over the time limit.
 Combined running/shooting: A 3 km run with pistol shooting (the athlete must hit five targets in 70 seconds) every kilometre. Starts were staggered based on points from the previous three events.

Schedule 
All times are UTC-3

Results 
Thirty-six athletes participated.
Key

Records

References

Modern pentathlon at the 2016 Summer Olympics
Men's events at the 2016 Summer Olympics